Kerstin Walther (born 15 April 1961 in Altenburg, Thuringia) is a retired East German sprinter.

She won both the 100 metres, the 200 metres and the 4×100 metres relay at the 1979 European Athletics Junior Championships. At the 1983 World Championships she won a gold medal in the 4×400 metres relay. Although it was Gesine Walther, Sabine Busch, Marita Koch and Dagmar Rübsam who ran in the final, Walther had run in the qualifying round.

Walther represented the sports club SC DHfK Leipzig, and won a silver medal at the East German championships in 1983 (400 metres). Her personal best times were 11.34 in the 100 metres, achieved in May 1982 in Jena, 22.34 in the 200 metres, achieved in June 1984 in Erfurt and 51.12 in the 400 metres, achieved in May 1983 in Jena.

Walther is 1.75 metres tall; during her active career she weighed 65 kg.

References

1961 births
Living people
People from Altenburg
Sportspeople from Thuringia
East German female sprinters
World Athletics Championships athletes for East Germany
World Athletics Championships medalists
SC DHfK Leipzig athletes
World Athletics Championships winners